Twitter diplomacy, is the use of the social media website Twitter by heads of state, leaders of intergovernmental organizations (IGOs), and their diplomats to conduct diplomatic outreach and public diplomacy.

Twitter has hosted a variety of diplomatic communications, ranging from cordial announcements of bi-lateral cooperation to diplomatic jabs to terse exchanges, as well as more casual posts.

Origins 
The term Twiplomacy was proposed in 2011 in one of the first studies of diplomacy within social networks. This report shows how presidents use Twitter to maintain diplomatic relationships with other presidents and political actors. However, while the use of Twitter by world leaders and diplomats was on the rise as of April 2014, Twitter diplomacy was only one aspect of the growing trend toward digital diplomacy, also known as Facebook diplomacy, by many world governments.

Twitter and diplomacy 

As of April 2014, Twitter had an estimated 241 million users, offering policymakers the possibility to interact with a worldwide audience.

World leaders and their diplomats have taken note of Twitter's rapid expansion and have begun using it to engage with foreign publics and their own citizens. US Ambassador to Russia Michael A. McFaul was one of the first diplomats to use Twitter for diplomacy after he become ambassador in 2011, by posting in English and Russian. A 2013 study by website Twiplomacy found that 153 of the 193 countries represented at the United Nations had established government Twitter accounts.  The same study also found that those accounts amounted to 505 Twitter handles used by world leaders and their foreign ministers, with their tweets able to reach a combined audience of over 106 million followers.

Commenting in a 2013 publication on the subject for the Geneva-based non-profit Diplo Foundation, former Italian Foreign Minister Giulio Terzi said of social media, "Social media exposes foreign policymakers to global audiences while at the same time allowing governments to reach them instantly [...] Twitter has two big positive effects on foreign policy: it fosters a beneficial exchange of ideas between policymakers and civil society and enhances diplomats' ability to gather information and to anticipate, analyze, manage, and react to events."

Controversy 
In April 2014, tensions between the US State Department and the Russian Ministry of Foreign Affairs over the 2014 Crimean crisis devolved into tweets, with both ministries using the hashtag #UnitedforUkraine to convey opposite points of view.

In early 2014, Iranian President Hassan Rouhani decided to delete a controversial tweet relating to the county's nuclear energy program that received media attention.

Use by governments and intergovernmental organizations 

Twiplomacy's 2013 study provided new insight into the use of Twitter by governments.  Twitter registration by region includes:
 Africa: 71% of governments
 Asia: 75% of governments
 Europe: 100% of governments
 North America: 18 governments
 Oceania: 38% of governments
 South America: 92% of governments

By heads of state and government 

Former US President Barack Obama is credited as being the first head of state to establish a Twitter account, originally affiliated with his 2008 presidential campaign, on March 5, 2007, as user number 813,286.  He was also the most followed head of state on Twitter.

Other heads of state and government to pioneer the conduct of Twitter diplomacy include Mexican president Enrique Peña Nieto, Belgian Prime Minister Elio Di Rupo, and Canadian Prime Minister Stephen Harper, all of whom joined Twitter in 2007.

Former US president Donald Trump, whose frequent and often controversial use of Twitter during the 2016 US presidential election campaign and since has become well known around the world, frequently engaged in Twitter diplomacy during his years in office.

By leaders of intergovernmental organizations 

As of April 2014, the United Nations (UN) is the most followed intergovernmental organization,  with its website showing over 2.56 million viewers in April 2014.  Many of the UN's subordinate funds and agencies also attract large numbers of followers.  The United Nations Children's Fund achieved greater popularity than its parent organization, the UN, and is followed by over 2.69 million as of April 2014.

By diplomats and diplomatic missions 

Former Israeli ambassador to the United States, Michael Oren, echoed the sentiment of many diplomats when responding to a May 2012 question about why he joined Twitter: "Today there are few alternatives as far-reaching and effective, with very wide audiences and young audiences, as Twitter. Twitter is another tool that enables me to communicate with other diplomats and journalists, while also allowing me to add a personal touch."

The UK Foreign and Commonwealth Office, for example, published a consolidated list of all UK missions on social media.

The United States State Department, one of the leaders in digital diplomacy, maintains an active presence on Twitter.  Although former United States Secretary of State Hillary Clinton encouraged American diplomats to tweet, she did not establish her personal handle until 2013, after she had already left office.  Moreover, former secretary John Kerry re-activated his personal Twitter handle after one year on the job.   Former US ambassador to the Russian Federation, Michael McFaul, pioneered the use of Twitter for American ambassadors with a steady stream of English/Russian tweets during his 2011–2014 tenure.  An academic by trade and not a career diplomat, Ambassador McFaul's tweets were generally blunt and un-polished—uncommon characteristics in the diplomatic world—earning both frequent criticism from the Russian government and praise from his supporters.

See also
 Hashtag activism
 Use of Twitter by public figures
 Volfefe index, volatility index related to Twitter usage of U.S. President

References

Further reading

 Andreas Sandre "Twitter for Diplomats", report  for Geneva-based, non-profit Diplo (2013)
 "Twiplomacy: Heads of state and government on Twitter, July 2013", Twiplomacy study (July 2013)

Diplomacy
International relations
Microblogging
Political science
Twitter
Web 2.0
21st century in politics